Hugh Norman Coventry (8 April 1922 – 21 July 2006) was an Australian rules footballer who played with Collingwood in the Victorian Football League (VFL).

Family
The son of Sydney Andrew Coventry (1899-1976), and Gladys Eileen Coventry (1901-1987), née Trevaskis, Hugh Norman Coventry was born at Clifton Hill on 8 April 1922.

He was the nephew of Gordon Coventry, and was named after another uncle, Hugh Norman "Oak" Coventry (1895-1916), who was (posthumously) mentioned in dispatches for "gallant devotion to duty as volunteer stretcher bearer, carrying the wounded" on 9 August 1916, and had been killed in action while serving with the First AIF in Pozieres,

He married Beth Gradwell at St John's Cathedral in Brisbane on 4 September 1945.

Collingwood (VFL)
He was cleared from Ivanhoe Amateur Football Club in the Victorian Amateur Football Association (VAFA) to Collingwood on 10 June 1940.

Military service
His career was interrupted by World War 2 after playing on the half-forward flank in Collingwood's 1940 Reserves Semi-Final team, and making his debut at 19 in 1941. He was awarded a Distinguished Flying Cross as a Flight Lieutenant.

Wycheproof (NCFL)
In 1952 he was the captain-coach of the Wycheproof Football Club in the North Central Football League (NCFL).

Notes

References
 
 World War Two Nominal Roll: Flight Lieutenant Hugh Norman Coventry (410042), Department of Veterans' Affairs.
 Honours and Awards (Recommendation): Flight Lieutenant Hugh Norman Coventry (410042), collection of the Australian War Memorial.
 Honours and Awards: Flight Lieutenant Hugh Norman Coventry (410042), Australian War Memorial.
 Supplement to the London Gazette, 23 March, 1945, p.1598.
 Royal Australian Air Force: Distinguished Flying Cross: "Flight Lieutenant Hugh Norman Coventry, No.410042", Commonwealth of Australia Gazette, No.70, (Thursday, 12 April 1945), p.855.

External links 

 
 
 Hugh Coventry, at Boyles Football Photos.
 Profile on Collingwood Forever

1922 births
2006 deaths
Australian rules footballers from Melbourne
Collingwood Football Club players
Ivanhoe Amateurs Football Club players
Royal Australian Air Force personnel of World War II
Royal Australian Air Force officers
Recipients of the Distinguished Flying Cross (United Kingdom)
People from Clifton Hill, Victoria